Robert Bossenger (17 September 1940 – 8 July 2013) was a South African cricketer. He played one first-class match for Eastern Province in 1964/65.

References

External links
 

1940 births
2013 deaths
South African cricketers
Eastern Province cricketers
Cricketers from East London, Eastern Cape